Somala is a small town in Chittoor district of the Indian state of Andhra Pradesh. It is the mandal headquarters of Somala mandal.

Geography 
It has an average elevation of  610 meters (2004 feet).

Per 2011 Census, Somala mandal has 13 major villages in it. 
1 Avulapalle
2 Irikipenta
3 Kamireddivaripalle
4 Kandur
5 Mittapalle
6 Nanjampeta 
7 Nellimanda
8 Peddauppara Palle
9 S. Nadim Palle
10 Somala town
11 Thamminayanipalle
12 Upparapalle
13 Valligatla

References 

Villages in Chittoor district
Mandal headquarters in Chittoor district